Ward 18 Willowdale is a municipal electoral division in Toronto, Ontario that has been represented in the Toronto City Council since the 2018 municipal election. It was last contested in 2018, with John Filion elected as the councillor for the 2018–2022 term.

History 
The ward was created in 2018 when the provincial government aligned Toronto's then-44 municipal wards with the 25 corresponding provincial and federal ridings. The current ward is made up of the former Ward 23 Willowdale, part of the former Ward 24 Willowdale, and a small portion of the former Ward 10 York Centre.

2018 municipal election 
Ward 18 was first contested during the 2018 municipal election. Prior to the provincial government realignment, Ward 23 councillor John Filion announced plans to retire, and endorsed candidates in both of the new wards covering the previous district under the city's planned 47-ward system: Filion's executive assistant Markus O'Brien Fehr, and community organizer Lily Cheng.

Following the realignment, Filion rescinded his retirement plans and entered the race for the new ward 18, citing fears of voter confusion with the restructured wards; O'Brien Fehr dropped out while Cheng remained in the race for the larger ward alongside a number of other challengers. Filion was ultimately elected with 31.06 per cent of the vote.

Geography 
Ward 18 is part of the North York community council.

Willowdale's boundaries mirror its federal and provincial counterparts, being bounded by Steeles Avenue (the city limit) to the north, Bayview Avenue to the east, Highway 401 to the south until it crosses the Don River, the Don River west branch to the southwest (from Highway 401 to Bathurst Street), and Bathurst Street to the west otherwise.

Councillors

Election results

See also 

 Municipal elections in Canada
 Municipal government of Toronto
 List of Toronto municipal elections

References

External links 

 Councillor's webpage

Toronto city council wards
North York
2018 establishments in Ontario